Apoprotein may refer to:

Apoenzyme, the protein part of an enzyme without its characteristic prosthetic group
Apolipoprotein, a lipid-binding protein that is a constituent of the plasma lipoprotein